"She Caught the Katy (And Left Me a Mule to Ride)" is a blues standard written by Taj Mahal and James Rachell. The song was first recorded for Taj Mahal's 1968 album The Natch'l Blues, and is one of Mahal's most famous tunes. It has since been covered many times, and it is included on the soundtrack for the 1980 movie The Blues Brothers (the song plays over the opening credits as Jake Blues leaves prison). According to John Belushi's widow, it was Belushi's favorite blues song.

The "Katy" refers to the Missouri–Kansas–Texas Railroad.

See also
List of train songs

References

1968 songs
Taj Mahal (musician) songs
The Blues Brothers songs
The Youngbloods songs
Blues songs
Songs about trains